James Paul Donahue Jr. (June 11, 1915 – December 6, 1966) was an heir to the Woolworth estate and a noted New York City socialite.

Early life
Jimmy Donahue was the second son of James Paul Donahue (1887–1931), the scion of an Irish American family which had made a fortune in the fat rendering business (Retail Butchers' Fat Rendering Company), by his wife Jessie ( Woolworth; 1886–1971), one of the three daughters of Frank Winfield "F. W." Woolworth, founder of the Woolworth retail chain. His older brother was Woolworth Donahue (1913–1972) who brought a cheetah to Cannes following a safari.

Donahue was a nephew of Edna Woolworth (1883–1917), a wealthy socialite and a nephew by marriage of Franklyn Laws Hutton (1877–1940), a co-founder of the brokerage firm E. F. Hutton & Co. He was also the first cousin and confidant of the American socialite Barbara Hutton (1912–1979).

Donahue was a high school dropout. He initially attended the Hun School at Princeton, NJ, and after his parents were advised to remove him from there, he was shifted to Choate Rosemary Hall in Connecticut. However, he was expelled from that school at age 17. Following his expulsion from Choate he took tap dance lessons with the tap dance master Bill "Bojangles" Robinson.

Career
Having been born into a wealthy family, Donahue never felt the need to earn a living, and indeed he lived lavishly, travelling the world with a valet in tow and staying at the most expensive hotels. He was known within his circle by the nickname "Jeem". 

A playboy by nature, he was a gay man at a time when the homosexual act was still illegal. Though press agents arranged for him to be seen with female escorts, his pursuits, until he met Wallis Simpson, Duchess of Windsor, were exclusively homosexual. In 1950, he was thirty-five when befriended by the Duke of Windsor and the Duchess. He claimed he had had a four-year affair with Simpson. This claim was verified by Lady Pamela Hicks, daughter of Earl Mountbatten of Burma, a cousin of the Duke of Windsor.

Jessie Donahue had several mansions built, including one in Palm Beach, Florida where the Duke and Duchess stayed. Jimmy reportedly kicked the Duchess in the shin during the Windsors' visit from the Bahamas where the Duke was Governor during the war. During the Harry Oakes murder case in 1943, the Duke turned to the same Miami police officers who had been their bodyguards on this earlier trip to Florida in 1941.

Donahue died in 1966 at the age of 51. He is buried in the Woolworth Family Mausoleum at Woodlawn Cemetery in the Bronx, New York.

References

Further reading
 Charles Higham. The Duchess of Windsor: The Secret Life. New York: McGraw-Hill Book Co. 482 pp 1988: 370–2, 394–5.

External links

1915 births
1966 deaths
Woolworth family
LGBT people from Connecticut
Gay men
American socialites
People from New York City
Burials at Woodlawn Cemetery (Bronx, New York)